Incarnate Word Academy can refer to:

Incarnate Word Academy (Bel-Nor, Missouri), St. Louis, Missouri
Incarnate Word Academy (Ohio), Cleveland, Ohio
Incarnate Word Academy (Brownsville, Texas), Brownsville, Texas
Incarnate Word Academy (Corpus Christi, Texas)
Incarnate Word Academy (Houston), Texas